Forstinger is a German surname. Notable people with the surname include:

 Hubert Forstinger (born 1946), retired Austrian football referee
 Monika Forstinger (born 1963), Austrian businesswoman and politician

German-language surnames